Dong Yang Animation Co., LTD is a South Korean animation studio that was founded in 1981 and contributed animation production services to many famous American animated shows since the late 1980s throughout the 1990s and the 2000s. It supplied its 2D Animation and 3D Animation services to major film studios like Warner Brothers, Disney, Hanna-Barbera, Filmation, DIC Entertainment, Saban Entertainment and Film Roman.

Projects
Among their most famous works are: Ghostbusters, Captain Nintendo, The Karate Kid, Captain Planet, Batman: The Animated Series, Mighty Max, The Sylvester & Tweety Mysteries, Gargoyles, Superman: The Animated Series, 101 Dalmatians: The Series, The New Batman Adventures (Won the 1998 Emmy Award for Animated Program), Freakazoid! (Won the 1998 Emmy Award for Animated Program), Histeria!, Animaniacs, Johnny Bravo, Big Guy and Rusty, Spider-Man Unlimited, Batman Beyond (Won the 2001 Emmy Award for Animated Program), Totally Spies!, Justice League, The Zeta Project, Static Shock, The Proud Family, He-Man and the Masters of the Universe, Xiaolin Showdown, Mucha Lucha, The Zula Patrol and The Batman.

References

South Korean animation studios
Emmy Award winners